Hronovce is a village and municipality in the Levice District in the Nitra Region of Slovakia.

History
In historical records the village was first mentioned in 1256.

Geography
The village lies at an altitude of 133 metres and covers an area of 30.96 km². It has a population of about 1,500 people.

Ethnicity

The majority of the Magyar population (99% aboriginal)- and living continuously in this village for more than 900 years, surviving the Osman occupation (lasting for 150 years) - was expelled to Hungary - mainly the Calvinists - on the basis of the brutal Kosice-Kassa Declaration of the Czechoslovak National-Socialist party's leader and president of CSR, E.Benes - between spring of 1945 - and the end of 1948. The remaining Magyar inhabitants were expelled for a transitional but genuine slavery (during an ice cold winter /1948-49/ in unheated waggons) to Sudetenland where from the German aborigines were thrown out.  "And"... - just after their arrival, they were sold as slaves to Czech and Moravian farmers.

The majority of expelled Magyars were members of the Reformed (Calvinist) community. At present (2000), the village is approximately 48% Magyars, 46% Slovak and 6% Romungro/Roma people/Gypsy.

Facilities
The village has a public library, a gym and a football pitch.

The first Magyar public school of the Calvinist-Reformed church was established already at the end of the 16th century and functioned continuously up to 1945 in Garamvezekény, when it was abandoned by the brutal Kosice-Kassa Law, in village Garamvezekény.

Genealogical resources

The records for genealogical research are available at the state archive "Statny Archiv in Nitra, Slovakia"

See also
 List of municipalities and towns in Slovakia

External links
Surnames of living people in Hronovce

Villages and municipalities in Levice District